David (Dave) Laverne Toycen,  (born March 28, 1947) was President and Chief Executive Officer of World Vision Canada who was involved with World Vision for over forty years.

He was made a member of the Order of Ontario in 2010. He is one of the 2016 inductees into Legends Row: Mississauga Walk of Fame.

References

External links
 Biography at Online Encyclopedia of Canadian Christian Leaders

1947 births
Canadian chief executives
Members of the Order of Canada
Members of the Order of Ontario
Living people
People from Eau Claire, Wisconsin
People from Mississauga